Tony Parenti (August 6, 1900 – April 17, 1972) was an American jazz clarinetist and saxophonist born in New Orleans, Louisiana, United States. After starting his musical career in New Orleans, he had a successful career in music in New York City for decades.

Biography
Parenti was a childhood musical prodigy, first on violin, then on clarinet. As a child he substituted for Alcide Nunez in Papa Jack Laine's band. In New Orleans he also worked with Johnny Dedroit. During his early teens, Parenti worked with the Nick LaRocca band, among other local acts. Parenti led his own band in New Orleans in the mid-1920s, making his first recordings there, before moving to New York City at the end of the decade. In the late 1920s, Parenti worked with Benny Goodman and Fred Rich, and then in New York City, where he worked through the 1930s as a CBS staffman and as a member of the Radio City Symphony Orchestra.

From 1939 until 1945, Parenti, with Ted Lewis's band, played alongside Muggsy Spanier. In 1944, he recorded and appeared in concert with Sidney Bechet and Max Miller in Chicago.

In the 1940s and still in New York City, Parenti formed a Dixieland jazz band called Tony Parenti and His New Orleanians, and which featured Wild Bill Davison, Art Hodes and Jimmy Archey, among others. He often appeared at such New York jazz spots as Nick's and Jimmy Ryan’s, and also worked with Eddie Condon. Parenti remained active until the 1960s in clubs, and died in New York City on April 17, 1972.

Over his career, Parenti recorded on the labels of Jazzology, Southland and Fat Cat, among several others.

Discography
 Que Records. 1957, Dixie By The "7" – Que JLS 5000

As leader
 Tony Parenti & His New Orleanians (Jazzology, 1949) with Wild Bill Davison, Jimmy Archey, Art Hodes, Pops Foster, Arthur Trappier
 Ragtime Jubilee (Jazzology)
 Ragtime! (Riverside Records 205)
 Tony Parenti & His Downtown Boys (Jazzology, 1955–65) with Dick Wellstood, Armand Hug
 Tony Parenti & His Ragtime Gang - Ragtime Jubilee (Jazzology J-21) the front cover reads: "Featuring Knocky Parker"
 The Final Bar (Jazzology, 1971) with Max Kaminsky, Charlie Bornemann, Bobby Pratt, Buzzy Drootin

References

Other sources
 Who's Who of Jazz. John Chilton, Da Capo, 1972
 Metronome Magazine, Dec 1946, Article by George Hoefer

1900 births
1972 deaths
20th-century American male musicians
20th-century clarinetists
20th-century American saxophonists
American jazz clarinetists
American jazz saxophonists
American male saxophonists
Jazz musicians from New Orleans
American male jazz musicians
Riverside Records artists